Maral Yusif gizi Rahmanzade (1916–2008) was an Azerbaijani graphic artist, People's Artist of Azerbaijan (1964), and recipient of the State Prize.

Biography
Maral Rahmanzade was born on July 23, 1916 in the Mardakan township near Baku, Azerbaijan. From 1930 to 1933 she studied at the Azerbaijan State Technical School of Arts and from 1934 to 1940 she continued her education at the Moscow State Institute of Arts. Her most productive area was within graphic arts, particularly in lithography and coloured linoprints. Rahmanzade created a series of paintings of patriotic content during the Great Patriotic War. One of the series is dedicated to the Soviet women during the wartime, including "People's volunteer corps", "Women in the ranks", "Partisan's daughter", and "Radio operator". Other series, consisting of 19 prints, were dedicated to the work of people and the home front: “Work on the farm”, “Social activists”, and “The artists performing for the front-line soldiers”. Women working at machines in factories are depicted in “Wives Substitute Husbands”. These paintings were made in black watercolors with accents in coal. In 1940s, Rahmanzade illustrated belles-lettres. In 1945, she illustrated the books “Dehname” by Khatai and "The land of fires" by Zohrabbeyov. More successfully, she worked on poetic images of women in "Dehname". Rahmanzade depicted the poet Khatai, the author of the book, in two illustrations: one of them a portrait in profile and the other the poet with a pen in hand in a night atmosphere. Rahmanzade portrayed circumstances, landscape, architecture, and costumes in numerous illustrations for the novel “The land of fires”. Riders were portrayed in the first illustration on the left side of a print. A pictorial panorama of a bay and a mysterious tower to which landlady they were going opened in front of their eyes. During these years Maral Rahmanzade created illustrations for Jafar Jabbarly's "Maiden Tower" and "Gulzar" works. In the post-war period Rahmanzade intensively worked in the sphere of paintings. In 1947, the series of "Petroleum" autolithography consisting of 10 paintings showing the history of petroleum land was exhibited for the first time. The series began with "Fire worshippers", a composition representing worship of eternal fire. Other paintings in these series are "A new enterprise", "On the oil rig", "Jack-pump", and "Fountain hammered to a pipe". In 1948, Maral Rahmanzade finished a series entitled "Socialistic Baku", consisting of 10 paintings. It included industrial and urban landscapes, and also such compositions as "Shift of a vigil", "Day of a vigil", and "In construction of a new house". Journeys to an area known as the oil rocks were productive for the artist. Maral Rahmanzade was the first artist who went to work at the oil rocks. Being among oilmen, overseeing their working days, and their everyday life, she painted field landscapes of the Caspian Sea, construction of scaffold bridges, oil tanks, towers, and the pouring of oil. On an exhibition she presented drawings and watercolor paintings, portraying more typical episodes of the working life of oilmen on the Caspian Sea. Besides the citizens of Baku, workers from the oil rocks also saw these paintings, as they were dedicated to them. Rahmanzade created a series of autolithographs called "Here in the Caspian Sea". An album, consisting of 15 colourful lithographs from these series was published in Moscow. Verticals of towers, steel scaffold bridges, and the shining mirror-like surface of the sea were portrayed in her "In the open sea" lithograph. The artist portrayed the hard life of workers and the distinctive life of oilmen in her paintings "On-duty boat", "The food is brought", and "To a storm-zone". These series of lithographs brought broad fame to Rahmanzade and were exhibited in the All-Union and foreign exhibitions.

Rahmanzade is the eldest sister of sculptor and honouree of the Academy of Arts of the Republic of Kazakhstan, Vagif Rakhmanov. She is the aunt of acclaimed Canadian singer-songwriter and visual artist Deniz Reno (aka Deniz Rakhmanova), Kazakh-German painter Nargis Rakhmanova-Dressler  and Kazakh artisan Aigul Rakhmanova.

In 1950, Rahmanzade illustrated a two-volume poem collection by Jafar Jabbarly. She created a number of prints, portraying the characters from his plays "Sevil", "Almaz", and "Withered flowers." Mirza Fatali Akhundov's historical play "Aldanmish Kevakib" ("Deceived stars") was published the same year and featured Rahmanzade's work. She also illustrated translated publications including "Eugene Onegin" by Alexander Pushkin and "A Hero of Our Time" by Mikhail Lermontov. At the end of the 1950s she created a series of colorful autholithographs called "Baku". Urban parks and squares and panoramas of marine oil fields are portrayed in these prints. The "Baku" series was in the exhibition dedicated to a decade of Azerbaijani literature and arts in 1959, in Moscow. At that time Rahmanzade worked on autolithographs dedicated to Czechoslovakia, among which were such landscapes as "A winter day of Karlovy Vary", "A street in Cheb city", "Central square of Cheb city", "Richmond sanatorium" and others. Lithographs from the Czechoslovakia series were exhibited in the Republican exhibition "The world through the eyes of Azerbaijani artists" in 1961, and also in a group exhibition dedicated to Czechoslovakia in Moscow.

In subsequent years, Rahmanzade worked in the technique of linocut. Her first pieces were dedicated to the giant factories of two young cities, Sumqayit and Rustavi. Each consists of six industrial and urban landscapes and two portraits portraying front-line workers. In 1960s, the artist visited a number of remote regions of Azerbaijan. A new series of colored linocuts was the result of these visits: “My Motherland” and “Azerbaijan”. Many of these paintings were dedicated to Nakhchivan. Plough land, furrow lines leading to the river, and a village stretched across the river were portrayed in one of these landscapes. In another linocut the artist depicted a new road in the mountains: a high-voltage power line and a highway against the backdrop of beautiful rocks. A landscape of Khinalig village in northern Azerbaijan was also depicted in these series besides the landscapes of Nakhchivan. In this remote village, surrounded by cliffs, with houses on the top of the mountain, as if they had been built on top of each other. The artist studied the daily lives of the residents of Khnialig and painted them with watercolors. In these linocuts the artist portrayed landscapes of the village, mountains eternally covered with snow, steep cliffs, simple buildings, and residents in national costumes. In 1956, Mammed Said Ordubadi's historical novel "A Sword and Pen", illustrated by Rahmanzade, was published in Baku. In 1963, she illustrated academic publications for "Azerbaijani fairytales".

The National Museum of Art of Azerbaijan held an exhibition of Rahmanzade's paintings, lithographs, lino-prints, drawings and book illustrations in November 2016.

Q Gallery, next to the Maiden Tower in Qulle 6, Baku, Azerbaijan, has examples of Maral Rahmanzadeh's paintings, drawings, lino-prints and lithographs.

References

1916 births
2008 deaths
Artists from Baku
Azerbaijani women painters
Soviet painters
20th-century Azerbaijani painters
20th-century Azerbaijani women artists
21st-century Azerbaijani painters
21st-century Azerbaijani women artists
Honored Art Workers of the Azerbaijan SSR
Moscow School of Painting, Sculpture and Architecture alumni